Nick de Bruijn (born 21 February 1987 in Schiedam) is a Dutch racing driver. He has competed in such series as International Formula Master and Formula BMW ADAC. He won the European KF1 Championship karting series in 2004.

Racing record

24 Hours of Le Mans results

References

External links
 Career statistics from Driver Database

1987 births
Living people
Sportspeople from Schiedam
Dutch racing drivers
Formula BMW ADAC drivers
International Formula Master drivers
NASCAR drivers
24 Hours of Le Mans drivers
European Le Mans Series drivers
Asian Le Mans Series drivers

Eurasia Motorsport drivers
Josef Kaufmann Racing drivers
ISR Racing drivers
Mücke Motorsport drivers
24H Series drivers